Igor Kunitsyn was the defending champion, but lost to Evgeny Korolev in the first round.Mikhail Youzhny won in the final 6–7(5–7), 6–0, 6–4 against Janko Tipsarević.

Seeds

Draw

Finals

Top half

Bottom half

External links
 Main Draw
 Qualifying Draw

Kremlin Cup
Kremlin Cup